Abdul-Hussein Abdul Redha Abtaan (born 1 May 1964) is an Iraqi politician and former Iraqi Minister of Youth and Sports. He served as deputy governor of Najaf (2005–2009), deputy in the Iraqi parliament from Najaf (2010–2014), and Minister of Youth and Sports in the Iraqi government from 2014 to 2018.

See also
Haider al-Abadi

References

External links
Ministry of Youth and Sports

Living people
Government ministers of Iraq
1964 births
Iraqi sociologists
Linguists from Iraq
People from Najaf